The Jardașița Mare (also: Iardașița) is a right tributary of the river Cerna in Romania. It flows into the Cerna near Bârza.

References

Rivers of Romania
Rivers of Caraș-Severin County